Lezay is a commune in the Deux-Sèvres department in western France.

See also
Communes of the Deux-Sèvres department

References

External links

 Local British-French association Méridien-Green
 Website Lezay
 Town twinning Barver Lezay

Communes of Deux-Sèvres